Drought in India has resulted in tens of millions of deaths over the 18th, 19th, and 20th centuries. Indian agriculture is heavily dependent on the country's climate: a favorable monsoon is critical to securing water for irrigating India's crops. In parts of India, failure of the monsoons causes water shortages, resulting in poor yields. This is particularly true of major drought-prone regions southeastern Maharashtra, northern Karnataka, Andhra Pradesh, Odisha, Gujarat, Telangana, and Rajasthan.

History 
Only about 35% of total agricultural land in India is irrigated and two-thirds of cultivated land is entirely dependent on rainfall. As such, the agricultural production system in the country is more vulnerable to damage from extreme climatic events, which causes increased water stress leading to inadequate water supplies for irrigation. Already, rises in average temperatures, changes in rainfall patterns, increasing frequency of extreme weather events, such as severe droughts and floods, and the shifting of agricultural seasons have been observed in different agro-ecological zones of India. Long drought spells during Kharif and increased temperatures and unseasonal heavy rains during the rabi season have caused serious distress to the farming communities in different states in recent years. Four major farming systems are prevailing in India: the irrigated system, rainfed system, silvo-pastoral system, and desert farming.

In the past, droughts have periodically led to major Indian famines, including the Bengal famine of 1770, in which up to one third of the population in affected areas died; the 1876–1877 famine, in which over five million people died; and the 1899 famine, in which over 4.5 million died. The 2013 Maharashtra drought affected 25 million people. In simple words, drought has destroyed India on a large scale. Eighteen meteorological and 16 hydrological droughts occurred in India between 1870 and 2018. The most severe meteorological droughts were in the years 1876, 1899, 1918, 1965, and 2000,  while the five worst hydrological droughts occurred in the years 1876, 1899, 1918, 1965, and 2000. The drought of 1899 can be classified as meteorological as well as hydrological and was the most severe documented drought India has ever experienced to date.

Droughts correlate with heat waves (see List of Indian heat waves).

Impact of El Niño 

All such episodes of severe drought correlate with El Niño–Southern Oscillation (ENSO) events. El Niño-related droughts have also been implicated in periodic declines in Indian agricultural output. Nevertheless, ENSO events that have coincided with abnormally high sea surfaces temperatures in the Indian Ocean—in one instance during 1997 and 1998 by up to 3 °C (5 °F)—have resulted in increased oceanic evaporation, resulting in unusually wet weather across India. Such anomalies have occurred during a sustained warm spell that began in the 1990s. A contrasting phenomenon is that, instead of the usual high pressure air mass over the southern Indian Ocean, an ENSO-related oceanic low pressure convergence center forms; it then continually pulls dry air from Central Asia, desiccating India during what should have been the humid summer monsoon season. This reversed air flow causes India's droughts. The extent that an ENSO event raises sea surface temperatures in the central Pacific Ocean influences the degree of drought. Around 43 per cent of El Niño events are followed by drought in India.

See also 

 List of cleanest cities in India
 Climate of India
 Climate change in India
 Peak water
 Environment of India
 Kalpasar Project
 Dissolved load
 Ground water in India
 Indian rivers interlinking project
 Interstate River Water Disputes Act
 Irrigation in India
 List of drainage basins by area
 List of rivers of India by discharge
 List of rivers by discharge
 List of dams and reservoirs in India
 List of water supply and sanitation by country
 Polavaram Project
 Pollution of the Ganges
 Indian water policy
 Saemangeum Seawall
 Water scarcity in India
 Water supply and sanitation in India
 Water pollution in India

References 

 .
 .
 .
 .
 .
 .
 .
 .
 .
 .
 .

Citations

Further reading
 Christopher de Bellaigue, "The River" (the Ganges; review of Sunil Amrith, Unruly Waters: How Rains, Rivers, Coasts, and Seas Have Shaped Asia's History; Sudipta Sen, Ganges: The Many Pasts of an Indian River; and Victor Mallet, River of Life, River of Death: The Ganges and India's Future), The New York Review of Books, vol. LXVI, no. 15 (10 October 2019), pp. 34–36. "[I]n 1951 the average Indian [inhabitant of India] had access annually to 5,200 cubic meters of water. The figure today is 1,400... and will probably fall below 1,000 cubic meters – the UN's definition of 'water scarcity' – at some point in the next few decades. Compounding the problem of lower summer rainfall... India's water table is in freefall [due] to an increase in the number of tube wells... Other contributors to India's seasonal dearth of water are canal leaks [and] the continued sowing of thirsty crops..." (p. 35.)

External links 

 General overview
 
 
 
 Drought hit areas in Karnataka, in pictures

 Maps, imagery, and statistics
 
 

 Forecasts
 

Climate of India
India